In the Ulster Cycle of Irish mythology, Dáire mac Fiachna is an Ulster cattle-lord and owner of Donn Cuailnge, the Brown Bull of Cooley, over which the Táin Bó Cuailnge (Cattle Raid of Cooley) was fought. Following the medieval Irish genealogies, Dáire mac Fiachna appears to have been a paternal relative of Conchobar Mac Nessa. He appears in the Táin Bó Regamon within a ghastly chariot alongside the Morrígan. He is described as a great man wrapped in a red cloak with a forked staff of hazel at his back. The Morrígan first introduces him as h-Uar-gaeth-sceo-luachair-sceo, before later revealing that he is Dáire mac Fiachna, and the owner of Donn Cuailnge.

When Queen Medb of Connacht discovered that her husband, Ailill, was considerably wealthier than her due to his possession of one extremely fertile bull, she resolved to even the account by possessing Dáire mac Fiachna's great bull, Donn Cuailnge. Queen Medb sent messengers to Dáire mac Fiachna with a generous offer of land, treasure, and if necessary, sexual favours, should Dáire mac Fiachna agree to loan her the bull for one year. Initially, Dáire mac Fiachna agreed. However, the Queen's messengers became inebriated, and one of the messengers drunkenly boasted that if Dáire mac Fiachna had not agreed, Queen Medb would have surely taken the bull by force. When Dáire mac Fiachna heard this slight, he backed out of the deal, and Queen Medb proceeded to take the bull, Donn Cuailnge, by force.

See also
 Dáire

References

Cecile O'Rahilly (ed & trans), Táin Bó Cúalnge from the Book of Leinster, Dublin Institute for Advanced Studies, 1967, pp. 138–141

Ulster Cycle
Characters in Táin Bó Cúailnge